Noel Knockwood, (1932-2014) a Canadian first nations leader and Mi'kmaq Grand Council member since 1975, was a spiritual leader of the Mi'kmaq People.

Early life
Knockwood was born in 1932. He gained a B.A. and belonged to the National Aboriginal Veterans Association, Ontario Region.

Career
He served as Sergeant-at-Arms for the Nova Scotia Legislature from 2000-2005 and was recognised at the 2002 National Aboriginal Achievement Awards, now the Indspire Awards, for his stewardship of history, culture and spirituality in the native community.

Knockwood also ceremonially lifted the curse from the Angus L. Macdonald Bridge at its opening in 1955, the first bridge to be erected across The Narrows, a strait in Halifax Harbour following the fall of two others previously.

Death
He died of a stroke on 7 April 2014, aged 81.

References 

1932 births
2014 deaths
20th-century First Nations people
21st-century First Nations people
General Assembly of Nova Scotia
Indspire Awards
Mi'kmaq people